Now Esto Es Musica! Latino (Translated: Now This Is Latin Music!) is a music compilation album that was released on March 21, 2006 as part of the U.S. Now That's What I Call Music! series. This is first of the series to focus on Latin music, especially Latin pop and Reggaeton.

Track listing 
Daddy Yankee – "Rompe"
Aventura featuring Don Omar – "Ella y Yo"
Juanes – "Para Tu Amor"
La 5ª Estación – "Daría"
RBD – "Nuestro Amor"
Kumbia Kings – "Na Na Na (Dulce Niña)"
Chayanne – "No Te Preocupes Por Mí"
Wisin & Yandel – "Llamé Pa' Verte"
Bebe – "Malo"
Ricardo Arjona – "Acompañame A Estar Solo"
Luis Fonsi – "Estoy Perdido"
Thalía – "Seducción"
La Secta AllStar – "La Locura Automatica"
Alexis & Fido – "Eso Ehh!"
Zion & Lennox featuring Daddy Yankee – "Yo Voy"
Angel & Khriz – "Ven Baílalo"
Cristian Castro – "Amor Eterno"
Reik – "Noviembre Sin Ti"
Sin Bandera – "Suelta Mi Mano"
Alejandro Fernández – "Para Vivir"

2006 compilation albums
Sony BMG Norte compilation albums
Latino 01
Spanish-language compilation albums
Latin music compilation albums